, is an original Japanese anime television series animated by Liden Films, directed by Aimi Yamauchi and written by Yamauchi and Teruko Utsumi. Original character designs are provided by Suzuhito Yasuda, while Majiro adapts the designs for animation. The music is composed by fox capture plan. The series aired on TV Asahi's  block from January 30 to April 17, 2022. The opening theme song is "The Warrior" by Novelbright, while the ending theme song is "Nisen Gohyaku Man no Ichi" by Mafumafu. Crunchyroll has licensed the series outside of Asia. Medialink licensed the series in Southeast Asia.

Summary
Mikoto Shiratori, a badminton prodigy with the ability of foresight, is fired from Mitsuhoshi Banking after losing a match for their company sports badminton team and is recruited by Sunlight Beverage to play for their team. Mikoto has vowed not to play on a doubles team following an incident at his interhigh match in high school. However, his co-worker, Tatsuru Miyazumi, encourages him to be his doubles partner, and Mikoto must work through his past trauma to overcome the struggles in their teamwork.

Characters

Sunlight Beverage

Mitsuhoshi Banking

Unisics

Tomari

 (Japanese); John Wesley Go (English)

 (Japanese); Caleb Yen (English)

Episode list

Notes

References

External links
Anime official website 

2022 anime television series debuts
Anime with original screenplays
Badminton mass media
Crunchyroll anime
Liden Films
Medialink
NUManimation
Sports anime and manga
TV Asahi original programming